This list of European Union Directives is ordered by theme to follow EU law. For a date based list, see the :Category:European Union directives by number. 

From 1 January 1992 to 31 December 2014, numbers assigned by the General Secretariat of the Council followed adoption, for instance: Directive 2010/75/EU. Since 2015, acts have been numbered following the pattern (domain) YYYY/N, for instance "Regulation (EU) 2016/1627" with
 domain being "EU" for the European Union, "Euratom" for the European Atomic Energy Community, "EU, Euratom" for the European Union and the European Atomic Energy Community, "CFSP" for the common foreign and security policy
 year being the 4 digit year
 the sequential number.
Some older directives had an ordinal number in their name, for instance: "First Council Directive 73/239/EEC".

Free movement and trade

Goods
Commission Directive 66/683/EEC of 7 November 1966 eliminating all differences between the treatment of national products and that of products which, under Articles 9 and 10 of the Treaty, must be admitted for free movement, as regards laws, regulations or administrative provisions prohibiting the use of the said products and prescribing the use of national products or making such use subject to profitability

Social and market regulation

Consumer protection
Directive 85/374/EEC: Product liability directive: establishes the principle of producer liability without fault applicable to European producers, such that "where a defective product causes damage to a consumer, the producer may be liable even without negligence or fault on their part".
Directive 98/27/EC on injunctions for the protection of consumers' interests, repealed by
Directive 2009/22/EC of the European Parliament and of the Council of 23 April 2009 on injunctions for the protection of consumers' interests.

Company law and finance
Seventh Directive: Consolidated accounts of companies with limited liability (Directive 83/349/EEC of 29/6/83).
Eighth Directive: Qualifications of persons responsible for carrying out the statutory audits of accounting documents (Official Journal L126 of 12.5.1984, on EUR-Lex).
Communication COM(2003)286 related to the Eighth Directive, aimed at reinforcing statutory audit in the European Union – Not published in the Official Journal. Objective: reinforcing public oversight of the audit profession; imposing the International Standards on Auditing (ISAs) for statutory audits in the European Union as of 2005; systems of disciplinary sanctions; establishing the transparency of audit firms; as regards corporate governance, reinforcing audit committees and internal control.
Audit directive 2006/43/EC of the European Parliament and of the Council of 17 May 2006 on statutory audits of annual accounts and consolidated accounts, amending Council Directives 78/660/EEC and 83/349/EEC and repealing Council Directive 84/253/EEC. Entered into force on 29 June 2006.
Directive 2009/49/EC of the European Parliament and of the Council amending Council Directives 78/660/EEC and 83/349/EEC as regards certain disclosure requirements for medium-sized companies and the obligation to draw up consolidated accounts, 18 June 2009, intended to reduce the administrative burdens placed on businesses. Implementation was required by Member States by 1 January 2011.
Non-financial reporting – Directive 2013/34/EU, concerning disclosure of non-financial and diversity information by certain large undertakings and groups, also known as NFRD, was amended by Directive 2014/95/EU of the European Parliament and of the Council of 22 October 2014. The directives provide for "a certain minimum legal requirement as regards the extent of the information that should be made available to the public and authorities by undertakings across the Union" and require "undertakings subject to this Directive" to give "a fair and comprehensive view of their policies, outcomes, and risks". Undertakings subject to the Directive are those with an average of over 500 employees during the reporting year. The directive is supported by non-binding guidelines on reporting methodology published by the European Commission on 26 June 2017. There are about 2000 companies (excluding exempted subsidiaries) affected by the requirements of the directive. On 21 April 2021, the European Commission adopted a proposal for a new directive to amend the existing reporting requirements, on which provisional agreement between the European Council and the European Parliament was reached on 21 June 2022. The proposal:
extends the duty to all large companies and all companies listed on a regulated market (except listed micro-enterprises)
requires the reported information to be audited 
introduces more detailed reporting requirements and a requirement to use mandatory EU sustainability reporting standards (to be developed)
requires businesses to digitally 'tag' the reported information so that it is machine readable.
The proposed standards were to be developed by October 2022.
Another proposed amendment to the 2013 directive was put forward by the Commission in April 2016 concerning disclosure of corporate tax information on a country-by-country basis.

 Alternative Investment Fund Managers Directive (AIFM) for investment funds
 Capital Requirements Directive (CRD) for bank capital 
 Markets in Financial Instruments Directive 2004 (MIFIR, MiFID-I, MiFID-II )
 Transparency Directive
Financial Collateral Directive 2002/47/EC
 Directive 2002/83/EC of the European Parliament and of the Council of 5 November 2002 concerning Life Assurance
 Payment Services Directive
 Undertakings for Collective Investment in Transferable Securities Directive 2009 (UCITS)

Insurance
The Insurance Distribution Directive (IDD, Directive (EU) 2016/97 of 20 January 2016) sets out regulatory requirements for firms designing and selling insurance products. It aims to enhance consumer protection when buying insurance, including general insurance, life insurance and insurance-based investment products (IBIPs) – and to support competition between insurance distributors by creating a level playing field. The directive replaced the previous Insurance Mediation Directive (IMD).

Pressure Equipment Directive ("PED") 2014/68/EU (formerly 97/23/EC)
 Airborne noise emitted by household appliances directive
 Noise emission in the environment by equipment for use outdoors directive

Competition law and procurement
 Coordinating the procurement procedures of entities operating in the water, energy, transport and postal services sectors directive – 2004/17/EC 31 March 2004, replaced by
Directive 2014/25/EU of the European Parliament and of the Council of 26 February 2014 on procurement by entities operating in the water, energy, transport and postal services sectors and repealing Directive 2004/17/EC.
 Coordination of procedures for the award of public works contracts, public supply contracts and public service contracts directive – 2004/18/EC 31 March 2004, replaced by 
Directive 2014/24/EU of the European Parliament and of the Council of 26 February 2014 on public procurement and repealing Directive 2004/18/EC
Remedies Directives: Directive 89/665/EEC (for the public sector) and Directive 92/13/EEC (for the utilities sector). These directives provide for a ten-day standstill period between the award decision and signature of a public contract, and require public authorities and utilities to inform all tenderers about the outcome of the tender process. Both were amended by
Directive 2007/66/EC – Remedies Directive.

Environmental law
Environmental assessment
 Strategic environmental assessment (Directive 2001/42/EC)
 Environmental impact assessment (Directive 2011/92/EU of the European Parliament and of the Council of 13 December 2011 on the assessment of the effects of certain public and private projects on the environment, amended by Directive 2014/52/EU of 16 April 2014)

Pollution and Waste
 The Directive 76/464/EEC of 4 May 1976 on pollution caused by certain dangerous substances discharged into the aquatic environment of the Community
 Packaging and packaging waste directive, 94/62/EC deals with the problems of packaging waste and the currently permitted heavy metal content in packaging
 Council Directive 96/61/EC of 24 September 1996 concerning integrated pollution prevention and control; replaced by Directive 2008/1/EC (see below)
 Landfill Directive, Council Directive 1999/31/EC of 26 April 1999
 RoHS Directive 2002/95/EC
 Waste Electrical and Electronic Equipment Directive ("WEEE directive"), Directive 2002/96, revised in 2006, 2009 and 2012, currently Directive 2012/19/EU on waste electrical and electronic equipment
 Battery directive (2006/66/EC in force from 6 September 2006), Directive 2006/66/EC of the European Parliament and of the Council of 6 September 2006 on batteries and accumulators and waste batteries and accumulators and repealing Directive 91/157/EEC. Directive 2006/66/EC was amended by Directive 2013/56/EU of 20 November 2013.
 Integrated Pollution Prevention and Control (Directive 2008/1/EC of the European Parliament and of the Council of 15 January 2008 concerning integrated pollution prevention and control)
 Waste framework directive (Directive 2008/98/EC of the European Parliament and of the Council on Waste)
Directive (EU) 2019/904 of the European Parliament and of the Council of 5 June 2019 on the reduction of the impact of certain plastic products on the environment (the "Single-Use Plastics Directive"), effective from 3 July 2021

Environment – Other
 Industrial Emissions Directive
 Floods directive
 Large Combustion Plant Directive (Directive 2001/80/EC of 23 October 2001 on the limitation of emissions of certain pollutants into the air from large combustion plants)
 Noise emission in the environment by equipment for use outdoors (2000/14/EC − ″OND″)
 Implementation of a Scheme for Greenhouse Gas Emission Allowance Trading Directive, amending Council Directive 96/61/EC (Directive 2003/87/EC of 13 October 2003)
 Freedom of access to information Directive, Directive 2003/4/EC of the European Parliament and of the Council of 28 January 2003 on public access to environmental information and repealing Council Directive 90/313/EEC
Air quality (Directive 2008/50/EC)
 Marine Strategy Framework Directive (Council Directive 2008/56/EC)

Intellectual property

 Patentability of computer-implemented inventions (proposed, then rejected)
 Directive on the legal protection of topographies of semiconductor products (87/54/EEC 16 December 1986)
 Trademark Directive (89/104/EEC 21 December 1988)
 Rental and lending rights (92/100/EEC)
 Satellite and Cable Directive (93/83/EEC 27 September 1993)
 Harmonising the term of copyright protection (Copyright Duration Directive) (93/98/EEC 29 October 1993) (replaced by Copyright Term Directive 2006)
 Database Directive (96/9/EC 11 March 1996)
 Patentability of biotechnological inventions (98/44/EC 6 July 1998)
 Legal protection of designs (98/71/EC)
 The Information Society Directive (2001/29/EC 22 May 2001)
 Directive on the re-use of public sector information (2003/98/EC 17 November 2003)
 Enforcement of intellectual property rights (Civil) (2004/48/EC 29 April 2004), also known as the Enforcement Directive
 Enforcement of intellectual property rights (Criminal) (withdrawn)
 Directive on Copyright in the Digital Single Market (2019)
 Computer Programs Directive (1991)
 Conditional Access Directive (1998)
 Copyright Term Directive (2006)
 Electronic Commerce Directive 2000 (2000)
 Resale Rights Directive (2001)

Public regulation

Energy
 Energy efficiency requirements for ballasts for fluorescent lighting directive
 Energy efficiency requirements for household electric refrigerators, freezers and combinations thereof directive
 Directive on electricity production from renewable energy sources 2001/77/EC (superseded)
 Promotion of cogeneration based on a useful heat demand in the internal energy market (2004/8/EC CHP directive)
 Promotion of the use of biofuels and other renewable fuels for transport
 Renewable energy directive 2009/28/EC
 Internal market in electricity directive 2009/72/EC
 Energy efficiency directive 2012/27/EU

Agriculture, forestry and water
 Colours for use in foodstuffs (1994/36/EC 30 June 1994)
 Food supplements directive (2002/46/EC 10 June 2002)
 Birds Directive (Council Directive 79/409/EEC and 2009/147/EC on the conservation of wild birds)
 Habitats Directive (Council Directive 92/43/EEC of 21 May 1992 on the conservation of natural habitats and of wild fauna and flora)
 Urban Waste Water Directive (Council Directive 91/271/EEC of 21 May 1991 concerning urban waste water collection and treatment)
 Water Framework Directive (Directive 2000/60/EC of the European Parliament and of the Council of 23 October 2000 establishing a framework for Community action in the field of water policy)
 Drinking Water Directive 1998 of 3 November 1998

Transport
Rail transport
 EU Directive 91/440 creation of open access railways ("de-monopolisation of railways"), with modifications forms part of the First Railway Package
 Second Railway Package (2004), a collection of directives concerning open access railway operations, specifically with respect to interoperability and safety
 EU Directive 2008/57/EC, an updated directive that covers the interoperability of both the Trans-European high-speed rail network and the Trans-European conventional rail network
 Interoperability of trans-European conventional rail system directive
 Interoperability of trans-European high-speed rail system directive

Road transport
Directive 80/1269/EEC – relating to the engine power of motor vehicles
Directive 96/53/EC - laying down for certain road vehicles circulating within the Community the maximum authorised dimensions in national and international traffic and the maximum authorised weights in international traffic
Directive 2004/54/EC of the European Parliament and of the Council of 29 April 2004 on minimum safety requirements for tunnels in the Trans-European Road Network
Directive 2008/96/EC of the European Parliament and of the Council of 19 November 2008 on road infrastructure safety management
Directive 2009/33/EC – the "Clean Vehicles Directive"
Directive (EU) 2019/1161, the revised Clean Vehicles Directive, adopted by the European Parliament and the Council in June 2019, and to be transposed into national law by 2 August 2021.

Transport – Other
 Lifts Directive
 Transportable pressure equipment directive

Communications and data
 Radio equipment and telecommunications terminal equipment and the mutual recognition of their conformity directive (1999/5/EC "R&TTE Directive")
 Radio Equipment Directive (2014/53/EU "RED Directive")
 Access and interconnection Directive 2002/19/EC
 "Authorisation" Directive 2002/20/EC
 "Framework" Directive 2002/21/EC
 Universal service and user's rights Directive 2002/22/EC
 Directive on Privacy and Electronic Communications 2002/58/EC
 Certain legal aspects of information society services, in particular electronic commerce, in the Internal Market directive – 2000/31/EC "Directive on electronic commerce", 8 June 2000
 Infrastructure for Spatial Information in the European Community (INSPIRE) – 2007/2/EC INSPIRE directive 14 March 2007

 General Data Protection Regulation (Regulation 2016/679), superseded the Data Protection Directive (95/46/EC 24 October 1995)
 Directive (EU) 2016/680 of the European Parliament and of the Council of 27 April 2016 on the protection of natural persons with regard to the processing of personal data by competent authorities for the purposes of the prevention, investigation, detection or prosecution of criminal offences or the execution of criminal penalties... on EUR-Lex
 Directive on a Community framework for electronic signatures (1999/93/EC 13 December 1999) on EUR-Lex
 Directive on Privacy and Electronic Communications (2002/58/EC 12 July 2002) on EUR-Lex
 Data Retention Directive (2006/24/EC 15 March 2006)
 Directive 2009/136/EC (25 November 2009) on EUR-Lex, was COD/2007/0248 in the Telecoms Package, amending Directive 2002/22/EC on universal service and users' rights relating to electronic communications networks and services, Directive 2002/58/EC concerning the processing of personal data and the protection of privacy in the electronic communications sector and Regulation (EC) No 2006/2004 on cooperation between national authorities responsible for the enforcement of consumer protection laws.
 Passenger Name Record (PNR) Directive (2016/681 of 27 April 2016) on EUR-Lex
Database Directive (declared invalid by CJEU)
Directive on the re-use of public sector information

Media
 Television Without Frontiers Directive (Council Directive 97/36/EC)

Other 
 Counterfeit goods regulation (2003)
 Community postal services Directive
 Commission Directive 91/71/EEC
Council Directive 96/82/EC of 9 December 1996 on the control of major-accident hazards involving dangerous substances, also known as the Seveso II Directive.
 Directive on taxation of savings income in the form of interest payments
 Directive 2004/38/EC on the right to move and reside freely
 96/71/EC Posted Workers Directive on the free movement of workers
Shareholders Rights Directive, originally adopted in 2007, and amended in June 2017 as the Shareholder Rights Directive II or SRD II.
 Temporary Protection Directive on handling a mass influx of refugees

Pharmaceuticals
 Directive 65/65/EEC1
 Directive 75/318/EEC
 Directive 75/319/EEC
 Directive 93/41/EEC
 Directive 2001/20/EC
 Directive 2001/83/EC
 Directive 2005/28/EC

Medical devices 
 Directive 93/42/EEC (Medical devices directive)
 Active Implantable Medical Devices Directive
 In vitro diagnostic medical devices directive

Weights and measures 
 Metric Directive 80/181/EEC
 Measuring instruments directive
 Non-automatic weighing instruments directive
 e-marking directive

Other safety measures
 Appliances burning gaseous fuels directive
 Artificial optical radiation directive (2006/25/EC in force from 5 April 2006)
 Cableway installations designed to carry persons directive
 Construction Products Directive
 Dangerous Preparations Directive (1999/45/EC in force from 30 July 2002)
 Efficiency requirements for new hot-water boilers fired with liquid or gaseous fuels directive ("Boilers directive")
 Electromagnetic compatibility directive ("EMC directive")
 Explosives for civil uses directive
 General product safety directive
 Low voltage Directive
 Marine equipment directive
 Recreational Craft Directive
 Registration, Evaluation and Authorisation of Chemicals ("REACH directive")
 Restriction of Hazardous Substances Directive (RoHS) ("RoHS directive")
 Restrictions on marketing and use of certain dangerous substances and preparations directive ("Azocolourants directive")
 Safety of toys directive
 Simple pressure vessel directive
 Tobacco Advertising Directive (IP/02/1788)
 Transportable Pressure Equipment Directive (2010/35/EU in force from 16 June 2010)

See also 
 European Union law
 European Union regulation
 EUR-Lex
 EudraLex

References

External links 
 EUR-Lex Directory of Community legislation in force

European Union directives
Directives